The Abuqiehai Formation is located in the Inner Mongolia Autonomous Region and is mainly composed of thin-bedded bamboo-leaf-like limestone, oolitic limestone, and an alternation of thick kidney limestone and shale. It has been dated to the mid-Cambrian period.

References 

Geologic formations of China
Cambrian System of Asia
Cambrian China
Limestone formations
Geology of Inner Mongolia